Joan Mesquida Ferrando (6 December 1962 – 19 October 2020) was a Spanish politician who served as a Deputy, having previously been Director-General of the Spanish National Police and Civil Guard.

References

1960s births
2020 deaths
Members of the Congress of Deputies (Spain)
Deaths from cancer in Spain